Akhmetzyanov is Tatar surname. Notable people with the surname include:

Ildar Akhmetzyanov (born 1983), Russian footballer and coach
Rustem Akhmetzyanov (born 1978), Russian footballer

Russian-language surnames
Tatar-language surnames